Xiamen Shuangshi High School of Fujian (Shuangshi or XMSS for short), which is also called Xiamen No. 8 High School once, is a public high school including both junior grades and senior grades. Shuangshi was founded by group of overseas Chinese living in the Philippines and famous people doing business in Xiamen in October, 1919. In 1956, it was taken over by the government and become a public high school.

Currently, Shuangshi has two campuses. The original campus, which is now the campus for junior grade students, resides along Zhenhai Road which is neighbor to the center of the city; the newer campus, which is now for senior grade students, which has an area of about 110,000 m2, is located aside the Fanghu Road East by the east shore of the island.

History
 In 1919, Shuangshi was first founded at Xiaxizai Street, named "Xiamen Shuangshi Type-2 Business School". Business and journalism are the subjects firstly started. Mr. Lin Zhuguang was the chairman of the board and Mr. Ma Qiaoru was the first principal.
 In 1924, Shuangshi was moved to the current campus which is on the north of Hongshan Mount, and renamed to "Xiamen Private Shuangshi Business High School".
 In 1925, Shuangshi was extended to a standard high school which have all 6 junior and senior grades, and renamed to "Xiamen Private Shuangshi High School". Once, it was the high school has most students in Fujian province.
 In 1937, because of World War II, Shuangshi was transplanted to Pinghe County, which is in the mountainous area of West Fujian. Due to the high reputation of the school, the amount of the student exceeded 1,000.
 In 1946, Shuangshi transplanted back to Amoy after the victory of World War II.
 In 1956, the government took over Shuangshi and turned it into public school, renamed it to "Xiamen Shuangshi High School".
 In 1959, Shuangshi earned the honor of "Red Flag High School" and became one of the first Key High Schools in Fujian Province.
 In 1965, due to the chaos of Cultural Revolution, the school was renamed again to "Xiamen No.8 High School", and the operation was almost suspended.
 In 1976, after the end of Cultural Revolution, the school began to resume its operation.
 In 1979, the school was enlisted into the first priority Key High Schools of Fujian province.
 In 1983, the school name was restored to "Xiamen Shuangshi High School".
 In 1996, Shuangshi reached the standard of First Class Qualified High School of Fujian province.
 In 2006, a new campus on the east of Jinshang Road, the west of Xianhuang Road and the north of Fanghu Road East was established and came into operation as the campus of senior grades.

Stories

 The name, Shuangshi, which in Chinese pinyin means exactly "Double Ten", was established in the memory of the Xinhai Revolution, a revolution on October 10, 1911, the Chinese bourgeois democratic revolution led by Dr. Sun Yat-Sen which overthrew the Qing Dynasty.
 The anniversary of Shuangshi is October 10, also in the memory of the Xinhai Revolution.
 In the older campus, there are 99 levels of steps, which intend to encourage students to overcome all difficulties bravely.

Sister Schools
 Taichung City Municipal Shuang-Shih Junior High School, Taiwan, since 2006.
 Wellington College and Wellington Girls' College, New Zealand, since 2008.

Famous Alumni
 Yanlin Zhuang Former chair-man of All-China Federation of Returned Overseas Chinese
 Huanzhi Li Famous Chinese Musician.

International Coordination
 Joined the GLOBE Program since the 1990s.
 Held The 3rd Asian-Pacific Astronomy Olympiad in November, 2007.

References

External links
 Website of Xiamen Shuangshi High School

Educational institutions established in 1919
Schools in Fujian
High schools in Fujian
High Schools in Xiamen
1919 establishments in China